Werner Werenskiold (28 April 1883 – 2 August 1961) was a Norwegian geologist and geographer. He was a son of Erik Werenskiold and visual artist Sophie Marie Stoltenberg Thomesen (1849–1926), and the brother of Dagfin Werenskiold.

Werenskiold made field studies in Telemark and Gudbrandsdalen in his younger days, and later focused on studies at Svalbard and of glaciers in Jotunheimen. He was the principal editor of the two-volume series Norge, vårt land (1936 – 1941) and the book series Jorden vår klode. He was a professor of geography at the University of Oslo from 1925.

He lived and died in Bærum, and was on the election ballot for the Liberal People's Party (formerly the Liberal Left Party) in the 1930s.

The mountain of Werenskioldfjellet at Hopen, Svalbard is named after him. The glacier of Werenskioldbreen in Wedel Jarlsberg Land, Svalbard is also named after him.

Bibliography (in selection) 
Text to geological map of the region between Sætersdalen and Ringerike, Norges geologiske undersøkelse no. 66, 1912
Norges fysiske og økonomiske geografi for gymnasiet (sm.m. E. Haffner), 1912 (8'th issue 1936)
Tekst til geologisk oversiktskart over det sydlige Norge. Maalestok 1:1 000 000, Norges geologiske undersøkelse no. 70, 1914, pp. 13–35
Mean Monthly Air Transport over the North Pacific Ocean, dr.avh., Geofysiske Publikasjoner, vol. 2 no. 9, 1922
Fysisk geografi, 2 bd., 1925–43 (issue 1: Geofysikk, meteorologi, oseanografi, 1925, bd. 2: Landkarter, landjordens form, 1943)
Geografi, tiltredelsesforelesning, in NGT 1927, pp. 1–9
Jorden, dets land og folk, 2 bd., 1931–34
Norge vårt land, 2 bd., 1936–41 (4'th issue in 3 bd., 1957)
Jord, vann, luft, ild. Fysisk geografi for hvermann, 1952
Jorden vår klode (sm.m. T. Width), 2 bd., 1956

References 

1883 births
1961 deaths
Norwegian expatriates in France
Norwegian geographers
20th-century Norwegian geologists
Academic staff of the University of Oslo
Free-minded Liberal Party politicians
20th-century Norwegian politicians
Bærum politicians
20th-century geographers